Prisoners is a 2013 American  thriller film directed by Denis Villeneuve from a screenplay written by Aaron Guzikowski. The film has an ensemble cast including Hugh Jackman, Jake Gyllenhaal, Viola Davis, Maria Bello, Terrence Howard, Melissa Leo, and Paul Dano.

The plot focuses on the abduction of two young girls in Pennsylvania and the subsequent search for the suspected abductor by the police. After police arrest a young suspect and release him, the father of one of the daughters takes matters into his own hands. The film was a financial and critical success, grossing US$122 million worldwide. It was chosen by the National Board of Review as one of the top ten films of 2013, and at the 86th Academy Awards, it was nominated for Best Cinematography.

Plot

In Pennsylvania, carpenter Keller Dover and his family visit their neighbors, the Birches, for Thanksgiving. Their four children together walk down their road together before dinner, past an RV. That evening, the families' daughters, Anna and Joy, disappear. Detective Loki arrests Alex Jones, a man driving an RV pointed out by Keller's son. Loki visits Alex's home where he lives with his aunt Holly, after getting no information via interrogation. Loki later reveals to the Dovers that Alex is intellectually disabled with an IQ of a 10 year old and no physical evidence has been found in the RV or his home. 

Loki investigates local sex offender and former priest Patrick Dunn, where he finds a corpse in a hidden cellar. Dunn reveals he killed the man after he confessed to murdering sixteen children. The following day, Alex is released. Convinced of his guilt, Keller assaults Alex outside the police station, during which Alex says "They didn't cry 'til I left them". Based on this, as well as an incident in which Keller witnessed Alex abusing his dog and singing a song Anna and Joy had been singing, Keller kidnaps and holds Alex captive in his childhood home. Joy's father Franklin reluctantly accompanies Keller in interrogating and torturing Alex over the course of several days; his wife Nancy convinces Franklin to stop, but decides not to turn in Keller. 

Loki visits the previous owner of the empty home the RV was seen parked in front of, Mrs. Milland. She tells him that her son Barry was kidnapped 26 years prior and was never found. During a vigil for Anna and Joy, Loki chases and fails to apprehend a hooded figure who then burglarizes the Dover and Birch residences; Keller's wife Grace, who has been prescribed medication to deal with the trauma of the kidnapping, notices this. Suspicious of Alex's disappearance, Loki follows Keller to the building but leaves when the hooded man, Bob Taylor, is located. Loki detains Taylor and discovers the walls in his home are covered in maze drawings. He stumbles upon several locked crates filled with snakes and bloody clothing. Taylor confesses to the kidnappings and draws mazes in his interrogation room. Frustrated, Loki assaults him, but Taylor gains control of another officer's gun and commits suicide.

The Dover and Birch families identify photos of the bloodied clothing as their children's. Keller visits Holly to apologize for assaulting Alex. He learns she and her late husband adopted Alex after their son died of cancer. Meanwhile, Loki notices a resemblance between one of Taylor's mazes and a necklace belonging to the corpse in Dunn's basement. He is informed that most of the bloody clothes were store-bought and soaked with pig blood. He also finds Taylor's footprints below a window at the Dover house, along with Anna's sock.

Joy is found and reunited with her parents, and is hospitalized; the two children were drugged and staged an escape, but Anna was caught. When Keller asks Joy for information, she remembers little, but says she saw him there. Keller realizes she saw him at Holly's house and flees. Loki travels to Keller's building to find him, but instead finds Alex.

Keller arrives at Holly's and she holds him at gunpoint. She reveals that she and her husband abducted children of Christian families as a "war on God" to avenge their son's death and make similar families feel the same crisis of faith. Alex (Barry Milland) was their first abduction and Taylor their second. Holly drugs Keller and imprisons him in a hidden pit in her yard, where he finds his daughter's emergency whistle. Loki arrives at Holly's house to inform her Alex has been found. Seeing a photo of her late husband with the maze necklace, he realizes that Holly is the kidnapper and searches for her, finding her in the process of giving Anna an injection. Loki kills Holly in a shootout and rushes Anna to the hospital while he nurses a head wound from his firefight.

Anna and Joy visit Loki in the hospital to thank him. Grace acknowledges that Keller will be arrested if found, but insists he is a good man. Later, Loki returns to Holly's house, where he faintly hears Keller blowing the whistle.

Cast 

 Hugh Jackman as Keller Dover
 Jake Gyllenhaal as Detective Loki
 Viola Davis as Nancy Birch
 Maria Bello as Grace Dover 
 Terrence Howard as Franklin Birch
 Melissa Leo as Holly Jones
 Paul Dano as Alex Jones
 Dennis Christopher as Mr. Jones
 Dylan Minnette as Ralph Dover
 David Dastmalchian as Bob Taylor
Brad James as Officer Carter
 Zoë Soul as Eliza Birch
 Erin Gerasimovich as Anna Dover
 Kyla-Drew Simmons as Joy Birch
 Wayne Duvall as Captain Richard O'Malley 
 Len Cariou as Father Patrick Dunn 
 Jeff Pope as Elliot Milland
 Gavin Octavien as Prison Guard

Production
Aaron Guzikowski wrote the script based on a short story he wrote, involving "a father whose kid was struck by a hit-and-run driver and then puts this guy in a well in his backyard". That short story was partially inspired by Edgar Allan Poe's "The Tell-Tale Heart". 

After he wrote the spec, many actors and directors entered and exited the project, including actors Christian Bale and Leonardo DiCaprio and directors Antoine Fuqua and Bryan Singer. 

Ultimately Guzikowski would credit producer Mark Wahlberg for getting the project on its feet, stating, "He was totally pivotal in getting the film made. That endorsement helped it get around." Principal photography began in Georgia in February 2013.

Reception

Box office 
Prisoners premiered at the 2013 Telluride Film Festival and was released theatrically in Canada and the United States on September 20, 2013. It was originally rated NC-17 by the MPAA for substantial disturbing violent content and explicit images; after being edited, it was re-rated R for disturbing violent content including torture, and language throughout. Prisoners opened in North America on September 20, 2013, in 3,260 theaters and grossed $20,817,053 in its opening weekend, averaging $6,386 per theater and ranking #1 at the box office. After 77 days in theaters, the film ended up earning $61,002,302 domestically and $61,124,385 internationally, earning a worldwide gross of $122,126,687, above its production budget of $46 million.

Critical response 
On review aggregator web site Rotten Tomatoes, the film has an approval rating of 81% based on 253 reviews, with a rating average of 7.30/10. The website's critical consensus states: "Prisoners has an emotional complexity and a sense of dread that makes for absorbing (and disturbing) viewing." On Metacritic, the film has a weighted average score of 70 out of 100, based on 53 critics, indicating "generally favorable reviews".

Christopher Orr of The Atlantic wrote: "Ethical exploration or exploitation? In the end, I come down reservedly on the former side: the work done here by Jackman, Gyllenhaal, and especially Villeneuve is simply too powerful to ignore." Ed Gibbs of The Sun Herald wrote: "Not since Erskineville Kings, in 1999, has Hugh Jackman appeared so emotionally exposed on screen. It is an exceptional, Oscar-worthy performance." Peter Travers of Rolling Stone wrote that Gyllenhaal was "exceptional" and that "Villeneuve takes his unflashy time building character and revealing troubled psyches in the most unlikely of places."

The film was a second runner-up for the BlackBerry People's Choice Award at the 2013 Toronto International Film Festival, behind Philomena and 12 Years a Slave. Gyllenhaal received the Best Supporting Actor of the Year Award at the 2013 Hollywood Film Festival for his "truly compelling, subtly layered" performance as Detective Loki.

Not all reviews were positive, however. Writing in The New Republic, David Thomson declared that the film was "weary after ten minutes" and furthermore "hideous, cruel, degrading, depressing, relentless, prolonged, humorless, claustrophobic, and a mockery of any surviving tradition in which films are entertaining". A mixed review came from Sheila O'Malley of RogerEbert.com, who gave the film 2.5 stars out of a possible 4. She wrote that Jackman's performance grew "monotonous" and that the film sometimes verged on pretentiousness, but was redeemed by a few excellent suspense sequences and Gyllenhaal's performance, whose "subtlety is welcome considering all the teeth gnashing going on in other performances".

Audiences 
Audiences polled by CinemaScore initially gave the film a grade "B+" on an A+ to F scale, but Warner Bros asked for a recount by the service and later said the film received a grade "A−".

Top ten lists

Prisoners was listed on various critics' top ten lists.
 1st – Nigel M. Smith, Indiewire
 2nd – Rex Reed, The New York Observer
 5th – Justin Robar, BridgewatersFinest
 6th – Kyle Smith, New York Post
 7th – James Berardinelli, Reelviews
 7th – Barbara Vancheri, Pittsburgh Post-Gazette
 9th – Owen Gleiberman, Entertainment Weekly
 Top 10 (listed alphabetically, not ranked) –  Calvin Wilson, St. Louis Post-Dispatch

Accolades

Soundtrack 
The Prisoners soundtrack, composed by Jóhann Jóhannsson, was released on September 20, 2013.

See also
 The Secret in Their Eyes (2009), an Argentine-Spanish film which includes a theme of suspect kidnapping.
 Secret in Their Eyes (2015), an American remake of The Secret in Their Eyes (2009).

References

External links 

 
 
 
 
 
 

2013 films
2013 crime drama films
2013 crime thriller films
2013 psychological thriller films
2013 thriller drama films
2010s American films
2010s English-language films
2010s vigilante films
Alcon Entertainment films
American crime drama films
American crime thriller films
American films about revenge
American psychological thriller films
American thriller drama films
American vigilante films
Films about child abduction in the United States
Films about father–son relationships
Films about missing people
Films directed by Denis Villeneuve
Films scored by Jóhann Jóhannsson
Films set in 2013
Films set in Pennsylvania
Films shot in Atlanta
Murder in films
Warner Bros. films